An alpine route is a trail or climbing route through difficult terrain in high mountains such as the Alps, sometimes with no obvious path. In the Alps, the Alpine clubs define and mark an alpine route, also called alpinweg or alpinwanderweg (alpine hiking trail).

More generally, the term is used for routes of crossing the Alps, such as Roman crossings and Napoleon crossing the Alps. It is also used to describe routes (trails, roads and railroads) in other mountains with alpine conditions.

Description 

Alpine routes are typically neither built nor maintained. They grew from being used traditionally over years or decades. Occasionally, dangerous and exposed sections may be equipped with protection such as wire cables, chains, abseiling points and bolts. This is kept to a minimum ("die absolute Ausnahme", the absolute exception), for both the preservation of the environment and to prevent liability issues for those who install the devices. Climber Paul Preuss argued in 1911 about the use of aids such as pitons on alpine routes in his essay "Artificial Aids on Alpine Routes".

In the Alps, the Alpine clubs mark their designated "Alpine Routes" in blue and white. In Austria and Germany the signs are blue-white-blue, in Switzerland the signs for the so-called "Alpinwanderwege" are marked white-blue-white signs. Sometimes the routes have no signs, only cairns ("Steinmandl", little stone man) or poles marking the way. Some routes require climbing skills of minor levels of difficulty (I and II according to UIAA).

To hike Alpine routes, climbers need physical fitness and good equipment, sure-footedness, and on some routes also a head for heights. They also need a good sense of direction and know to use maps and compass. If they don't have alpine experience, they should use a mountain guide. Clothing has to be weatherproof. Some routes require climbing equipment such as ropes and ice axes, some even need crampons. It is of prime importance to check weather and route conditions beforehand.

Alpine routes are graded according to different systems. In Switzerland, an Alpinwanderweg is a marked hiking trail of the highest grade in difficulty according to the Swiss Alpine Club's hiking grades.

History 

The first Roman road connecting Italy with today's Germany was the Via Claudia Augusta, completed in 46–47 AD, from Verona to the Reschen Pass, the Inn valley and the Fern Pass to Augusta Vindelicorum, today Augsburg. The most ancient pass of the Western Alps is the Great St Bernard Pass, used as far back as the Bronze Age and showing traces of a Roman road.  Napoleon crossed the Alps here in May 1800, depicted in an idealised view by Jacques-Louis David in Napoleon Crossing the Alps and, less idealised, by Hyppolyte Delaroche in Bonaparte Crossing the Alps.

Notable examples 

 Alpine Pass Route
 Garibaldi Provincial Park
 Mount Torment
 Tatoosh Range
 Valhalla Provincial Park
 Vratsata Gorge

References 

Mountaineering